Mian Mahalleh-ye Chaf Gavieh (also Romanized as Mīān Maḩalleh-ye Chāf Gāvīeh) is a village in Shirju Posht Rural District, Rudboneh District, Lahijan County, Gilan Province, Iran. At the 2006 census, its population was 127, in 41 families.

References 

Populated places in Lahijan County